Clarion Area High School is a public junior and senior high school in Clarion, Pennsylvania.  The school went through its last addition and renovation process in 1997, at which time, modern technology was added to the school's curriculum. Part-time vocational training is held at Clarion County Career Center, and 65% of students pursue one or more extra-curricular activities.

Athletics
Clarion Area participates in Pennsylvania Interscholastic Athletic Association District 9.

References 

Public high schools in Pennsylvania
Public middle schools in Pennsylvania
Schools in Clarion County, Pennsylvania